Walker Valley is a geographic feature in the Prince Charles Mountains in Antarctica.

Walker Valley may also refer to:

Walker Valley, New York
Walker Valley High School